Las Rozas may refer to:

Places
Spain
Las Rozas de Madrid, municipality in the Community of Madrid
Las Rozas de Valdearroyo, municipality in Cantabria

Sport
Las Rozas CF, Spanish football club
Las Rozas Black Demons, American football club from Las Rozas de Madrid, Spain